Juan Vizcaíno Morcillo (born 6 August 1966) is a Spanish retired footballer who played mainly as a defensive midfielder.

Regarded and praised as an accomplished role player, his career was intimately connected with Atlético Madrid. Over 13 seasons he amassed La Liga totals of 396 matches and 33 goals, also representing in the competition Zaragoza and Valladolid.

Club career
Born in La Pobla de Mafumet, Tarragona, Catalonia, Vizcaíno started playing with hometown's Gimnàstic de Tarragona. He was offered his first-team debut by coach Xabier Azkargorta during the 1982–83 season not yet aged 17, with the club in the third division.

In 1986, Vizcaíno stayed in that level as he moved to Real Zaragoza, starting playing with its reserves. He made his La Liga debut against Sevilla FC on 9 March 1988, and remained a regular fixture until the end of his stay with the Aragonese side, while also scoring ten league goals from a defensive position.

Vizcaíno signed with Atlético Madrid for the 1990–91 campaign, starting every game he appeared in during four of his first five years. In the sixth, he was the outfield player with most appearances (41 matches, 3,136 minutes played and three goals) as the capital team conquered the double.

After two more solid years, Vizcaíno left for Real Valladolid, joining Elche CF for 2000–01 and closing out his career at almost 35 with his first club, Gimnàstic – the latter two in the second level. He stayed in the region afterwards, working for the city hall's sports departments in Pobla de Mafumet.

Vizcaíno returned to Atlético in the 2011–12 season, being appointed new manager Gregorio Manzano's assistant.

International career
Vizcaíno won 15 caps for the Spain national team, the first arriving on 16 January 1991 in a friendly with Portugal (1–1, in Castellón de la Plana). The nation did not qualify for UEFA Euro 1992, and the player was ousted from the call-ups shortly after the arrival of new coach Javier Clemente.

Honours
Atlético Madrid
La Liga: 1995–96
Copa del Rey: 1990–91, 1991–92, 1995–96

References

External links
 
 
 
 

1966 births
Living people
People from Tarragonès
Sportspeople from the Province of Tarragona
Spanish footballers
Footballers from Catalonia
Association football midfielders
La Liga players
Segunda División players
Segunda División B players
Gimnàstic de Tarragona footballers
Real Zaragoza B players
Real Zaragoza players
Atlético Madrid footballers
Real Valladolid players
Elche CF players
Spain international footballers